The Son is an American western drama television series based on the 2013 novel of the same name by Philipp Meyer. The show was created and developed by Meyer, Brian McGreevy, and Lee Shipman. Twenty episodes over two seasons aired from April 8, 2017, through June 29, 2019.

Plot
In 1849, Eli McCullough is kidnapped at the age of 13 by Comanches and raised as an adopted son. In 'present-day' 1915, he is a powerful, ruthless cattle baron turned oilman, and struggles to maintain his business empire as he looks to pass it on to his sons and grandchildren.

Cast
 Pierce Brosnan as Eli McCullough, a Texas cattle baron who takes an interest in the oil industry
 Jacob Lofland as young Eli (known to the Comanche as Tiehteti Taiboo "Pathetic White Boy")
 Henry Garrett as Pete McCullough, Eli's youngest son
 Zahn McClarnon as Toshaway, a Comanche tribal chief who views young Eli as a son after capturing him
 Jess Weixler as Sally McCullough, Pete's wife
 Paola Núñez as María García, Pete's childhood friend who becomes complicit in some of the escalating violence in South Texas
 Elizabeth Frances as Prairie Flower 
 Sydney Lucas as Jeannie McCullough, Eli's granddaughter and Pete's daughter, who becomes a key figure in the family business
Lois Smith as Jeannie at age 85
David Wilson Barnes as Phineas McCullough, Eli's middle son.

Production
Originally, Sam Neill was set to play the main character of the series, but left due to personal reasons. Pierce Brosnan was cast to replace him. The production of the series started in June 2016. The series was filmed in and around Austin, TX.

A 10-episode season premiered on AMC on April 8, 2017. On May 12, 2017, the series was renewed for a second season. The second and final season premiered on April 27, 2019.

Episodes

Season 1 (2017)

Season 2 (2019)

Reception
The first season received mixed reviews among critics. On review aggregator website Rotten Tomatoes, the first season has an approval rating of 52% based on 27 reviews, with an average rating of 5.9/10. The site's critical consensus reads, "The Son epic narrative and strong central performance are crippled by sluggish pacing, hasty direction, and superficial execution." On Metacritic, the series has a score of 57 out of 100, based 22 critics, indicating "mixed or average reviews".

References

External links
 
 
 

2010s American drama television series
2017 American television series debuts
2019 American television series endings
AMC (TV channel) original programming
English-language television shows
Serial drama television series
Television shows based on American novels
Television shows set in Texas
2010s Western (genre) television series